"Breaker-Breaker" is a song by the American Southern rock band Outlaws. Written by Hughie Thomasson  it is the opening track and lead single from the band's 1976 album Lady in Waiting. It peaked at number 94 on the Billboard Hot 100 and peaked at #19 in July 1976 in the Netherlands. The lyrics capitalize on the 1970s CB radio fad. Brett Adams of Allmusic called it "bright, easygoing country-rock".

Track listing
7" Vinyl
"Breaker - Breaker" (Thomasson)  2:55   
"South Carolina" (Henry Paul)  3:04

Personnel
Hughie Thomasson - lead guitar, vocals
Billy Jones - lead guitar, vocals
Monte Yoho - drums
Frank O'Keefe - bass guitar
Henry Paul - electric and acoustic guitar, vocals

Chart performance

Notes

1976 singles
1976 songs
Outlaws (band) songs
Song recordings produced by Paul A. Rothchild
Songs written by Hughie Thomasson
Arista Records singles
Citizens band radio in popular culture
Songs about truck driving